The African Diamond Producers Association (ADPA) is an intergovernmental organization that seeks to strengthen the level of influence African diamond-producing countries have on the world diamond market.

ADPA implements policies, strategies and laws that assist the generation of diamond profits from foreign diamond mining companies to its Member States.

The organization was formed on 4 November 2006 as a continental branch of the African Diamond Council, Africa's supreme diamond governing body.

The initiative to establish the ADPA was initially adopted and backed by Angolan President José Eduardo dos Santos.

Angola is the interim executive secretariat as well as home to the organization's headquarters.

Both the ADC and ADPA organization's executive secretariat and headquarters are in the Republic of Angola.

Members

 Angola
 Botswana
 Cameroon
 Central African Republic
 Democratic Republic of the Congo
 Ghana
 Guinea
 Namibia
 Sierra Leone
 South Africa
 Tanzania
 Togo
 Zimbabwe

Observers
 Algeria
 Republic of the Congo
 Gabon
 Cote d'Ivoire
 Liberia
 Mali
 Mauritania

References

External links
 "Africa: Diamond Lobby Talks of Beneficiation" AllAfrica.com 3 May 2007
 "ADC sets '07 Budget for ADPA" Diamonds.net 30 April 2007

2006 establishments in Africa
Blood diamonds
Diamond industry
Diamond mining companies
International organizations based in Africa
International trade organizations
Luanda
Mining in Africa
Natural resources in Africa
Organizations based in Angola
Organizations established in 2006
Manufacturing trade associations